The Feyzin Refinery (Raffinerie de Feyzin) is an oil refinery in south-east France, one of seven oil refineries in France.

History
Until 1964 most of the petrol in France was refined by British or American companies. A law was passed on 28 February 1963 declaring that at least 20% of the petrol refined in France had to have French involvement, by imposing import quotas.

The state-owned l'Union générale des pétroles (UGP) was formed on 19 June 1960.

By 1965 France was refining around 70m tonnes of oil per year.

Elf was formed on 27 April 1967. Elf merged with ERAP in 1976, then merged with Total in 2003.

Elf opened the Grandpuits refinery in 1967. The site has mainly been owned by Elf Aquitaine (Essence et Lubrifiants de France).

In 1973, a subsidiary of Elf became
Sanofi, currently the world's fifth-largest pharmaceutical company.

Construction
Work started April 1963, with the first products made in June 1964.

It opened on 15 October 1964, owned by UGP. It could process 6,000 tonnes per day with 2m tonnes of products a year
It cost 250m francs, which was 75% funded by the state.

Explosion in January 1966
The Feyzin disaster was on 4 January 1966.

Structure
It is on the South European Pipeline, built in 1962 by the Société du pipeline sud-européen (founded in 1958), with an extension first proposed in April 1970.

See also
 List of oil refineries

References

External links
 Feyzin refinery

1964 establishments in France
Commercial buildings completed in 1964
Energy infrastructure completed in 1964
Oil refineries in France
TotalEnergies